The  was a commuter electric multiple unit (EMU) train type formerly operated by the private railway operator Nagoya Railroad (Meitetsu) in Japan from 1961 until December 2009. The 7000 series included the 7100 series, 7500 series, and 7700 series.

Preserved examples
Cars 7027, 7092 and 7028 are preserved at Chukyo Racecourse.
Cars 7001 and 7002 are preserved at Maigi inspection center.

References

External links

 Arigatō Panorama Car 

Electric multiple units of Japan
7000 series
Train-related introductions in 1961

Nippon Sharyo multiple units
1500 V DC multiple units of Japan